Mark A. Seidl (born November 19, 1946) is an American lawyer and jurist.  He served as a judge of the Wisconsin Court of Appeals for a six-year term (2015–2021) in the court's Wausau-based District III.  He did not seek a second term in 2021.

Life and career 
Seidl was born in Fort Atkinson, Wisconsin and raised in the northern Wisconsin communities of Stanley and Medford. His father, Peter Seidl, served as a circuit court judge in Taylor County from 1962 until 1980. The younger Seidl graduated from the University of Wisconsin-Eau Claire in 1968 and worked as a high school and college instructor until 1971, when he entered the University of Wisconsin Law School. Seidl received his J.D. degree in 1974 and entered private practice in Wausau. Seidl worked as a general practice attorney for more than 40 years, handling civil, family, real estate, and probate matters.

In 2015, Seidl contested a seat on District III of the Wisconsin Court of Appeals vacated by the retirement of Judge Michael W. Hoover.  He faced Eau Claire County circuit judge Kristina Bourget, who was appointed to the bench by Governor Scott Walker in 2013. Seidl defeated Bourget in the April general election and assumed office in August.

References

1946 births
Living people
People from Fort Atkinson, Wisconsin
Politicians from Wausau, Wisconsin
University of Wisconsin–Eau Claire alumni
University of Wisconsin–Madison alumni
University of Wisconsin Law School alumni
Educators from Wisconsin
Wisconsin Court of Appeals judges
People from Stanley, Wisconsin
People from Medford, Wisconsin
People from Wausau, Wisconsin
21st-century American judges